Xerotricha is a genus of small air-breathing land snails, a terrestrial pulmonate gastropod mollusks in the subfamily Helicellinae of the family Geomitridae.

Species 
Species in the genus Xerotricha include:
 Xerotricha adoptata (Mousson, 1872)
 Xerotricha apicina (Lamarck, 1822)
 Xerotricha barcinensis (Bourguignat, 1868)
 Xerotricha bierzona (Gittenberger & Manga, 1977)
 Xerotricha conspurcata (Draparnaud, 1801) - type species
 Xerotricha corderoi (Gittenberger & Manga, 1977)
 Xerotricha gasulli (Ortiz de Zárate y López, 1950)
 Xerotricha gonzalezi (Azpeitia Moros, 1925)
 Xerotricha huidobroi (Azpeitia Moros, 1925)
 Xerotricha jamuzensis (Gittenberger & Manga, 1977)
 Xerotricha lancerottensis (Webb & Berthelot, 1833)
 Xerotricha madritensis (Rambur, 1868)
 Xerotricha mariae (Gasull, 1972)
 Xerotricha nodosostriata (Mousson, 1872) (uncertain)
  Xerotricha nubivaga (Mabille, 1882)
 Xerotricha orbignii (d'Orbigny, 1836)
 Xerotricha pavida (Mousson, 1872)
 Xerotricha renei (Fagot, 1882)
 Xerotricha silosensis (Ortiz de Zárate y López, 1950)
 Xerotricha vatonniana (Bourguignat, 1867)
 Xerotricha zaratei (Gittenberger & Manga, 1977)
 Xerotricha zujarensis (Ortiz de Zárate y López, 1950)

References

 Kobelt, W. (1892). Literaturbericht. Nachrichtsblatt der Deutschen Malakozoologischen Gesellschaft, 24 (7/8): 149-152. Frankfurt am Main 
 Bank, R. A. (2017). Classification of the Recent terrestrial Gastropoda of the World. Last update: July 16th, 2017

External links

Geomitridae